Kim Ye-won (born December 5, 1989), also known mononymously as Yewon, is a South Korean actress, singer and entertainer. She debuted in 2011 as a member of K-pop girl group Jewelry. Alongside her singing career, she appeared on television in dramas, sitcoms and variety shows. After Jewelry disbanded in early 2015, Kim joined the fourth season of reality show We Got Married, where she was paired with singer Henry Lau. It was confirmed that her contract with Star Empire Entertainment would be expired in the end of October 2016. She later signed Jellyfish Entertainment in November 2016.

Early life and education
Kim Ye-won was born in South Jeolla Province, South Korea. Kim attended Myongji College where she studied Applied Music.

Controversies
In March 2015, while filming the Korean TV show My Tutor Friend Lee Tae-im and Kim Ye-won had a fight, with Lee Tae-im reportedly swearing at Kim Ye-won. After the incident, Lee Tae-im claimed that Kim Ye-won initiated the fight by using informal speech to address her, as informal speech is considered rude to be used while addressing older people and seniors in Korean culture. Despite her claims, Lee Tae-im received public backlash, which caused her to withdraw from My Tutor Friend and other TV shows she was in. She publicly apologized to Kim Ye-won and announced hiatus.

However, less than a month later, video footage of Lee Tae-im and Ye-won quarrelling began circulating on the Internet, proving Lee Tae-im's claims that Kim Ye-won used informal speech to address her. This caused the public sentiment to shift, with Kim Ye-won's remarks from the footage becoming a subject of various parodies. After the backlash, Kim Ye-won ultimately apologized to Lee Tae-im.

Career

2011–2014: Debut with Jewelry, minor acting roles

Yewon made her debut on 8 January 2011, with Star Empire Entertainment's girl group Jewelry. A digital single, "Back It Up" was released on January 27 along with its accompanying music video. Yewon made her first appearance on stage  with the performance on M! Countdown.

On 20 September 2011, Yewon, together with bandmate Semi, formed a sub-unit called "Jewelry S". They debuted with "Ames Room Vol.2", the title track being the song "Forget It".

Soon after her debut with "Jewelry S", she was invited to join her first variety show as a cast member on "Invincible Youth". Yewon also landed her first acting role in the SBS Plus drama, Oh My God. Yewon also played some minor roles in "Standby" and "Reply 1997".

Yewon made her film debut in Gladiators of Rome with the Korean dubbing.

2015–present: Disbandment of Jewelry, solo activities
On January 7, 2015, the group was officially confirmed as disbanded.

After the disbandment of the group, Yewon joined the reality programme titled We Got Married, pairing with Canadian-born singer and actor, Henry Lau.

In November 2016, Yewon left Star Empire Entertainment and joined Jellyfish Entertainment as an actress.

On December 13, 2016, together with other Jellyfish Entertainment's artists such as Seo In-guk, VIXX, Gugudan, Park Yoon-ha, Park Jung-ah, Kim Gyu-sun, and Jiyul, released their Jelly Christmas 2016 single album with the song, "Falling", as part of their digital music channel project Jelly Box.

In 2018, Yewon joined the cast of What's Wrong with Secretary Kim.

In 2022, Kim signs a contract with Andmarq in May 2022.

Filmography

Film

Television series

Web series

Variety show

Discography

Jewelry

Collaborations

References

External links 

1989 births
Living people
K-pop singers
South Korean female idols
South Korean women pop singers
South Korean dance musicians
South Korean television actresses
South Korean television personalities
South Korean radio presenters
Jewelry (group) members
South Korean women radio presenters